The 1959 Washington Huskies football team represented the University of Washington during the 1959 NCAA University Division football season.  Home games were played on campus in Seattle at Husky Stadium.

In its third season under head coach Jim Owens, Washington was 9–1 in the regular season and 3–1 in the Athletic Association of Western Universities, one of three co-champions of the five-team AAWU (Big Five) in its inaugural year. The Pacific Coast Conference (PCC) had disbanded in the spring, and the AAWU consisted of the four teams from state of California and the Huskies. The other four PCC teams from the north (Oregon, Oregon State, Washington State, and Idaho) were independent for several years. (Washington defeated all four this season.) The Cougars joined the league in 1962 and the Oregon schools in 1964; it was later renamed the Pacific-8 Conference.

Led on the field by junior All-American quarterback Bob Schloredt, the Huskies started the season unranked and gained the Rose Bowl berth. Eighth-ranked, they were a 6½-point underdog to the #6 Wisconsin Badgers (7–2), the champions of the Big Ten. On New Year's Day in Pasadena, Washington jumped out to a 17–0 lead in the first quarter and won in a  rout to finish the season at 10–1. The Rose Bowl victory was the first for a West Coast team in seven years, and only the second since the end of  the loser both times was Wisconsin.

Washington outscored its opponents 253 to 73, and outside the sole loss to USC, they allowed no more than twelve points in each of their other ten games, with four shutouts. The final rankings in this era were released in early December, at the end of the regular season and prior to the bowl games.

Schedule

All-Coast

Professional football draft selections
No University of Washington Huskies were selected in the 1960 NFL Draft, which lasted twenty rounds with 240 selections. or in the inaugural 1960 AFL Draft, which lasted thirty-three rounds with 264 selections.

References

Washington
Washington Huskies football seasons
Pac-12 Conference football champion seasons
Rose Bowl champion seasons
Washington Huskies football